Köşk is a district in Aydın Province, Aegean Region, Turkey. Köşk is a noun in Turkish and refers to an ornate wooden mansion, smaller than a palace.

References

External links
 the municipality
 the district governorate
 

Populated places in Aydın Province
Districts of Aydın Province
Köşk District